State Highway 164 (SH 164) is a Texas state highway that runs from near Waco to Buffalo. The route was originally designated on September 17, 1930 from SH 6 to the town of Mart, and was extended to Groesbeck on August 15, 1933. On July 15, 1935, the east end was cut back to the Limestone County Line. On February 11, 1937, the section from the Limestone County Line to Groesbeck was restored. SH 164 extended to Buffalo on November 16, 1937.

Major intersections

References

164
Transportation in McLennan County, Texas
Transportation in Limestone County, Texas
Transportation in Freestone County, Texas
Transportation in Leon County, Texas